Michel Jules Alfred Bréal (26 March 183225 November 1915), French philologist, was born at Landau in Rhenish Palatinate. He is often identified as a founder of modern semantics.

Life and career
Michel Bréal was born at Landau in Germany of French-Jewish parents. 

After studying at Wissembourg, Metz and Paris, he entered the École Normale Supérieure in 1852. In 1857 he went to Berlin, where he studied Sanskrit under Franz Bopp and Albrecht Weber. On his return to France he obtained an appointment in the department of oriental manuscripts at the Bibliothèque Impériale. In 1864 he became professor of comparative grammar at the Collège de France, in 1875 member of the Académie des Inscriptions et Belles-lettres, in 1879 inspecteur général for higher education until the abolition of the office in 1888. In 1890 he was made commander of the Legion of Honour. He resigned his chair in 1905, and died in Paris. 

In 1883, Bréal  coined the term semantics in the article “Les lois intellectuelles du langage. Fragment de sémantique” published in the journal Annuaire de l'association des études grecques en France (page 133).

Works
Among his works, which deal mainly with mythological and philological subjects, may be mentioned:
L'Étude des origines de la religion zoroastrienne (1862), for which a prize was awarded him by the Académie des Inscriptions
Hercule et Cacus (1863), in which he disputes the principles of the symbolic school in the interpretation of myths
Le Mythe d'Œdipe (1864)
Les Tables eugubines (1875)
Mélanges de mythologie et de linguistique (2nd. ed., 1882)
Leçons de mots (1882, 1886)
Dictionnaire étymologique latin (1885)
Grammaire latine (1890).
Essai de sémantique (1897), on the signification of words, which was translated into English by Mrs Emmeline Cust with preface by J. P. Postgate.
a translation of Bopp's Comparative Grammar (1866–1874), with introductions, which is highly valued.
He also wrote pamphlets on education in France, the teaching of ancient languages, and the reform of French orthography. In 1906 he published Pour mieux connaitre Homère.

Michel Bréal can also be credited with the invention of the marathon race. He made the suggestion to put this event on the programme of the first modern Olympics in Athens in 1896 to his friend Pierre de Coubertin. The event was to commemorate the Greek soldier Pheidippides who, according to several legends, ran from the Battle of Marathon to either Athens or Sparta.

 Hans W. Giessen, Heinz-Helmut Lüger, Günther Volz (Hrsg.): Michel Bréal – Grenzüberschreitende Signaturen. Verlag Empirische Pädagogik, Landau 2007 
 Hans W. Giessen & Heinz-Helmut Lüger: Ein Grenzgänger der ersten Stunde. Michel Bréal: Vom Marathon zum Pynx in: Dokumente. Zs. für den deutsch-französischen Dialog. Gesellschaft für übernationale Zusammenarbeit, Bonn. Heft 4 / 2008, pp. 59 – 62 ISSN 0012-5172
 Hans W. Giessen: Mythos Marathon. Von Herodot über Bréal bis zur Gegenwart. (= Landauer Schriften zur Kommunikations- und Kulturwissenschaft. Band 17). Verlag Empirische Pädagogik, Landau 2010, .
 Heinz-Helmut Lüger (dir.), Hans W. Giessen (dir.) et Bernard Weigel (dir.), Entre la France et l'Allemagne : Michel Bréal, intellectuel engagé, Limoges, Lambert-Lucas, 2012
 Brigitte Nerlich: Michel Bréal: mettre l’homme dans la langue. In: Penser l’histoire des savoirs linguistiques. Hommage à Sylvain Auroux. Textes réunis par Sylvie Archaimbault Jean-Marie Fournier & Valérie Raby, 611-619. Lyon: ENS, 2013.. 
 Jan Noordegraaf: Salient scholars. Michel Bréal and his Dutch connections. In: Penser l’histoire des savoirs linguistiques. Hommage à Sylvain Auroux. Textes réunis par Sylvie Archaimbault Jean-Marie Fournier & Valérie Raby, 621-632. Lyon: ENS, 2013.. http://hdl.handle.net/1871/51333

References

External links

 Michel Bréal Society, Michel-Bréal-Gesellschaft

People from Landau
1832 births
1915 deaths
French philologists
École Normale Supérieure alumni
Marathon running
Commandeurs of the Légion d'honneur
Academic staff of the Collège de France
Members of the Académie des Inscriptions et Belles-Lettres
Academic staff of the École pratique des hautes études